Mastax nana is a species of beetle in the family Carabidae found in Chad, Mali and Democratic Republic of the Congo.

References

Mastax nana
Beetles of Africa
Beetles described in 1949